San Isidro is a barrio in the island-municipality of Culebra, Puerto Rico. Its population in 2010 was 16.

It consists of a part of the island of Culebra in the northeast, and of islands and islets such as Roca Speck, Cayo Norte, Cayo Sombrerito, Cayos Geniquí, Cayo Tiburón, and Cayo Ballena.

See also

 List of communities in Puerto Rico
 List of barrios and sectors of Culebra, Puerto Rico

References

External links

Barrios of Culebra, Puerto Rico